Kafr Sabt was a Palestinian Arab village of nearly 500 situated on a sloping plain in the eastern Lower Galilee located  southwest of Tiberias. It was depopulated in 1948.

Location, geography
Kafr Sabt was set near the eastern margin of a large plateau, just south of the ancient main road linking the coastal city of Acre with the Jordan Valley and Transjordan. The road descends from the village to the Jordan Valley deep below by following Wadi Fidjdjas, a valley offering the least steep route available. Kafr Sabt benefited of the large springs from Wadi Fidjdjas.

History

Roman period
During the Roman period, Kafr Sabt was known as Kafar Shabtay, meaning "village of Sabbath". It is mentioned in Genesis Rabbah, a midrash written between 300 and 500 CE: "Beth Ma'on, they ascend to it from Tiberias, but they go down to it from Kefar Shobtai."

Early Muslim period
Arab geographer al-Muqaddasi mentions the village in 985, while under Abbasid rule as being "between Tiberias and Ramla, situated near 'Akabah (the Pass above) Tiberias. He says that it belonged to Caesarea and was large, populated, and had a mosque on its main street.

Crusader/Ayubid period

Crusader "Cafarsset"
The Crusaders called it "Cafarsset" when they conquered the Levant in the twelfth century. The village belonged to the Latin abbey of Mount Tabor and one of the abbey's turcopoles originated from Cafarsset.

Kafr Sabt, located on a high plateau bordering the Horns of Hattin, served as a strategic position for Saladin's army since there he could threaten Tiberias to the rear, Sepphoris in the front, the Crusader lines of communications between the two strongholds, and his army could easily retreat down the slopes if necessary. He encamped in Kafr Sabt before he led his army to their decisive victory at the Battle of Hattin.

Ayyubid rule
Arab geographer Yaqut al-Hamawi passed through the village in the thirteenth century while Kafr Sabt was in Ayyubid hands.

Ottoman period
Kafr Sabt was incorporated into the Ottoman Empire in 1517, and by 1596, it was under the administration of the nahiya ("subdistrict") of Tiberias, part of Sanjak Safad, with a population of 29 Muslim households; an estimated  160 persons. The villagers   paid  a fixed tax rate of 25% on various agricultural products, including  wheat, barley, cotton, beehives, and goats;  a total of 5,700 akçe.

A map from Napoleon's invasion of 1799 by Pierre Jacotin  showed the place, named as  K. el Sett.

Victor Guérin visited in 1875,  and noted: "Near a spring, inclosed in a small circular basin, the soil is covered with the confused debris of many overthrown houses; some still standing are inhabited. Here and there are scattered cisterns cut in the rock. On the highest point of the hill, formerly occupied by the ancient town, are observed the remains of a strong edifice built of cut stones, which seems to have been put up for military purposes; it formed a quadrilateral forty paces long. Beside a mosque may be remarked two broken capitals in debased Corinthian, as well as several columns belonging probably to an ancient church, now completely destroyed."

In 1881, the PEF's Survey of Western Palestine (SWP) described it as a stone-built village with 300 inhabitants.

A population list from about 1887 showed Kefr Sabt to have about 410 inhabitants; all Muslims.

British Mandate period
Under the British Mandate of Palestine from 1922 to 1948, Kafr Sabt housed members of the Bedouin tribe of 'Arab al-Mashariqa who lived in tents. The village residents were described as migrants from Algeria.

In the 1922 census of Palestine, the population of Kufr Sabt was 247; all Muslims, increasing in the  1931 census to 340; still all Muslims, in a total of 71 houses.

Agriculture was the main economic sector with the primary crops being grain and fruit orchards. In the 1945 statistics, the population reached 480 Muslims, and the total land area owned by Arabs was 4,295 dunams. Of this, 7 dunams were for plantations and irrigable land, 4,258 for cereals, while 30 dunams were built-up land.

1948 and aftermath
During the 1948 Arab-Israeli War, Kafr Sabt's inhabitants fled on April 22, as a direct result of the capture of Tiberias, four days before, to the Haganah — the army of Israel. In 1949, two Jewish settlements, Ilaniya and Sharona feuded over possession of Kafr Sabt's lands, with the former arguing that they deserved compensation for early Arab attacks on their town, while the latter also had designs for it, and took it by force. The Agriculture Minister of Israel intervened ordering Sharona's farmers to retreat. According to Palestinian historian Walid Khalidi, as of 1992 Piles of stone and stone terraces provide the main indications that the village once occupied the site. Cactuses and a few scattered trees grow among the rubble on the village site. The lands around the site are planted in grain, fruit trees, and almond trees.

References

Bibliography

 (p. 367)

External links
Welcome to Kafr Sabt
Kafr Sabt,  Zochrot
Survey of Western Palestine, Map 6: IAA, Wikimedia commons 
Kafr Sabat, from  Khalil Sakakini Cultural Center

Arab villages depopulated during the 1948 Arab–Israeli War
District of Tiberias